Cryptophasa immaculata is a moth in the family Xyloryctidae. It was described by Scott in 1864. It is found in Australia, where it has been recorded in New South Wales.

Adults are glossy silvery-white.

The larvae feed on Banksia integrifolia. They bore in the stem of their host plant, tying cut leaves at the entrance to the bore.

References

Cryptophasa
Moths described in 1864